Katowice is a Polish parliamentary constituency in the Silesian Voivodeship.  It elects thirteen members of the Sejm.

The district has the number '31' for elections to the Sejm and is named after the city of Katowice.  It includes the county of Bieruń-Lędziny and the city-counties of Katowice, Chorzów, Mysłowice, Piekary Śląskie, Ruda Śląska, Siemianowice Śląskie, Świętochłowice, and Tychy.

List of members

Sejm, elected in 2015

Footnotes

Electoral districts of Poland
Katowice
Silesian Voivodeship